Ahrenshöft (North Frisian: Oornshaud) is a municipality in Nordfriesland district, in northern Germany.

The municipality covers an area of 8.65 km². 
Of the total population of 527, 268 are male, and 259 are female (Dec 31, 2002). 
The population density of the community is 61 inhabitants per km².

References

Nordfriesland